The Whigham GW-7 is an American mid-wing, single-seat, 15 metre class glider that was designed and constructed by Gene Whigham, a retired Convair flight test engineer.

Design and development
Whigham's last glider design was the GW-7. The aircraft was completed and first flew in 1987.

The GW-7 is of all metal construction, has a  wing span and employs a NASA NLF(1)-0215F airfoil. The flaps and ailerons are interconnected. The flaps travel +/-10° in normal flight in concert with the ailerons and then can be deployed to 60° for glidepath control on landing.

Only one GW-7 was constructed and it was registered with the Federal Aviation Administration as an Experimental - Amateur-built.

Operational history
In July 2011 the sole GW-7 built was still on the FAA registry and owned by Donald Macey of Fallon, Nevada.

Specifications (GW-7)

See also

References

1980s United States sailplanes
Homebuilt aircraft
Aircraft first flown in 1987
Mid-wing aircraft